Canus Natus was a French Saint in the fifth century.

Early life
Canus Natus was born in the fifth century. He was white-haired upon his birth, a sign of wisdom at the time. The phrase "canus natus" in Latin means "he was born old."

Religious vocation
He became a hermit in a place called Sauzet, described by Christophe de Villeneuve-Bargemon (1771–1829) as a "desert" with "willow trees."

According to Henri François Xavier de Belsunce de Castelmoron (1671–1755), one of his miracles occurred when a dead reed he used as a cane was brought back to life, looking green again. This miracle led him to accept a tenure as the Bishop of Marseille in the second half of the fifth century. During his tenure, he strongly opposed paganism and heresy.

Death and legacy
Upon retirement, he settled in Sauzet again, and died there on October 15, 490. After he was buried there, it became a hamlet and took his name. It is now known as the village of Saint-Cannat. Additionally, the Église Saint-Cannat in Marseille, built from 1526 to 1619, is named in his honour.

References

Bishops of Marseille
490 deaths
5th-century Christian saints
French Roman Catholic saints
Year of birth unknown